Saxophone Colossus is the sixth studio album by American jazz saxophonist Sonny Rollins. Perhaps Rollins's best-known album, it is often considered his breakthrough record. It was recorded monophonically on June 22, 1956, with producer Bob Weinstock and engineer Rudy Van Gelder at the latter's studio in Hackensack, New Jersey. Rollins led a quartet on the album that included pianist Tommy Flanagan, bassist Doug Watkins, and drummer Max Roach. Saxophone Colossus was released by Prestige Records to critical success and helped establish Rollins as a prominent jazz artist.

In 2016, Saxophone Colossus was selected for preservation in the National Recording Registry by the Library of Congress as being "culturally, historically, or artistically significant".

Background

There are five tracks on the album, three of which are credited to Rollins. "St. Thomas" is a calypso-inspired piece named after Saint Thomas in the Virgin Islands. The tune is traditional and had already been recorded by Randy Weston in 1955 under the title "Fire Down There". (In the booklet provided with the boxed set, The Complete Prestige Recordings, Rollins makes it clear that it was the record company that insisted on his taking credit.) In any case, the piece has since become a jazz standard, with this being its most famous recorded version.

The final track, "Blue 7", is a blues piece, over eleven minutes long. Its main, rather disjunct melody was spontaneously composed. The performance is among Rollins's most acclaimed, and is the subject of an article by Gunther Schuller entitled "Sonny Rollins and the Challenge of Thematic Improvisation". Schuller praises Rollins on "Blue 7" for the use of motivic development exploring and developing melodic themes throughout his three solos, so that the piece is unified, rather than being composed of unrelated ideas.

The original 22 June 1956 session was recorded by Rudy Van Gelder. A CD version, mastered by Steve Hoffman, was released in May 1995 by DCC Compact Classics; no additional performances were included. Another remastered version, this time by Van Gelder, was released on 21 March 2006. The album's title was devised by Prestige Records' in-house publicity director Robert "Bob" Altshuler.

Release and reception

Independent sources have differed in their reporting of the album's release date. According to The Mojo Collection, it was released in the autumn of 1956, while an August 1957 issue of Billboard magazine listed the album among records released in the period between March 16 and July of that same year. Reviewing in April 1957, Billboard said "Rollins' latest effort should really start musicians buzzing", as "the tenorman is one of the most vigorous, dynamic and inventive of modern jazzmen", and "everytrack is packed with surprises, tho Rollins develops each solo with great architectural logic". Ralph J. Gleason reviewed the album later in June for DownBeat, writing:

In a retrospective review for AllMusic, Scott Yanow called Saxophone Colossus "arguably his finest all-around set", while German musicologist Peter Niklas Wilson deemed it "another milestone of the Rollins discography, a recording repeatedly cited as Rollins' chef d'oeuvre, and one of the classic jazz albums of all time".
In 2000 it was voted number 405 in Colin Larkin's All Time Top 1000 Albums. The Penguin Guide to Jazz included the album in its suggested “core collection” of essential recordings, and in addition to its maximum rating of four stars awarded it a “crown”, indicating an album for which the authors felt particular admiration or affection.

Track listing

Side one

Side two

Personnel
Sonny Rollins – tenor saxophone
Tommy Flanagan – piano
Doug Watkins – bass
Max Roach – drums

References

External links 
 
Interview with Sonny Rollins from the Library of Congress

1956 albums
Sonny Rollins albums
Prestige Records albums
Albums produced by Bob Weinstock
Albums recorded at Van Gelder Studio
United States National Recording Registry recordings
United States National Recording Registry albums